HMS Hursley was a Second World War Type II Hunt-class escort destroyer of the British Royal Navy. She is the only Royal Navy ship to have carried this name. Hursley is a village in Hampshire. Commissioned in 1942, she served in the Mediterranean, before being transferred to the Hellenic Navy in November 1943 and renamed Kriti. She took part in the landings in Sicily, Anzio, and southern France, and remained in Greek service until 1959.

Construction
Hursley was ordered with 15 others of the same type on 20 December 1939 as part of the War Emergency Programme. The ship was laid down by Swan Hunter at Wallsend on 21 December 1940 as Admiralty Job No. J4139, launched on 25 July 1941, and completed on 2 April 1942.

Service history

HMS Hursley
After sea trials Hursley was commissioned for service on 2 April 1942. She sailed for Scapa Flow for training, and then joined the escort for Russian Convoy PQ 15 to Murmansk and back. Assigned to the Eastern Fleet, in May she joined the escort for Convoy WS 19 to Durban. There she was transferred to the 5th Destroyer Flotilla in the Mediterranean, owing to heavy losses in "Operation Vigorous", and sailed to Alexandria, Egypt, where she was deployed for flotilla duties in eastern Mediterranean.

On 14 September Hursley and  escorted the tug Brigand out to rendezvous with the cruiser  and the destroyer , both damaged during "Operation Agreement" at Tobruk. Coventry was sunk, but Hursley took Zulu in tow, but under attack by enemy aircraft Zulu was sunk.

In October Hursley carried out two diversionary operations in support of the 8th Army operations "Lightfoot" and "Supercharge" during the battle of El Alamein.

On 17 November she was deployed for the defence of the Malta relief Convoy MW 13 in "Operation Stone Age", coming under air attack, but arriving safely on the 19th, and returned to Alexandria on the 21st.

The submarine was carrying ammunition and fuel to Tripoli, and was carrying 11 British prisoners of war. 28 Italians and 8 of the prisoners died in the sinking.

Transferred to the 22nd Destroyer Flotilla, her convoy defence and support duties continued into April. On 8 May she was deployed in "Operation Retribution", part of the blockade positioned in the Cap Bon area to intercept vessels evacuating enemy troops from North Africa. On 12 May she took part in a landing operation on the Tunisian island of Zembra with Aldenham and Hellenic Navy ship Kanaris, returning to Malta with captured enemy personnel.

After usual escort and support duties, in July she joined Support Force East as an escort for assault convoys and in support of landings during the Allied invasion of Sicily ("Operation Husky"). She was attached to Escort Group R, and sailed from Alexandria as part of the escort for Convoy MWF 36, returning to Alexandria the next day to escort follow-up Convoy MWS 36. She then sailed to Syracuse for further support duties.

In September Hursley was attached to the Levant Flotilla to support military operations in the Dodecanese Campaign to occupy various Italian-occupied Greek islands after the armistice with Italy. Hursley remained on operations in the Aegean until 2 November, when she was transferred to the Royal Hellenic Navy and renamed Kriti ("Crete").

Kriti

Despite her new name and new crew, the ship remained part of the 22nd Destroyer Flotilla, and in January 1944 was assigned to duties escorting convoys from North Africa to Naples in preparation for the planned Allied landings at Anzio ("Operation Shingle"). She was attached to the Southern Attack Force ("Force X-Ray") under U.S. Navy command to support the landing by the U.S. VI Corps. On 20 January she sailed from Naples and two days later, as the troops went ashore, provided support despite enemy air attacks. Kriti remained at Anzio into February providing defence for military convoys and fire support for ground troops.

From March to July she returned to normal flotilla duties while based at Algiers, then in August took part in "Operation Dragoon", the invasion of Southern France. She sailed from Naples on 12 August as part of the escort of Convoy SF2, which comprised 38 LCIs, arriving at "Delta Beach" (Saint-Tropez) two days later.

Kriti resumed her usual duties in September, but was transferred to the British Aegean Force to support military operations to re-occupy the Aegean islands and Greek mainland. In November she was transferred to the Greek 12th Flotilla at Piraeus, and was engaged in supporting military operations in the Aegean until the end of the war in Europe in May 1945.

After V-E Day she was transferred on loan to the Royal Hellenic Navy and remained there until 12 December 1959 when she reverted to Royal Navy control and was placed on the Disposal List. The ship was sold for breaking-up in Greece on 27 April 1960 and towed to ship-breakers later that year.

References

Publications
 
 English, John (1987). The Hunts: a history of the design, development and careers of the 86 destroyers of this class built for the Royal and Allied Navies during World War II. England: World Ship Society. .

 

Hunt-class destroyers of the Royal Navy
Ships built by Swan Hunter
Ships built on the River Tyne
1941 ships
Hunt-class destroyers of the Hellenic Navy
World War II destroyers of the United Kingdom